Manhattan Transfer may refer to:
 Manhattan Transfer station, a Pennsylvania Railroad station in New Jersey
 Manhattan Transfer (novel), a 1925 novel by John Dos Passos
 "Manhattan Transfer", 1984 episode of Right to Reply
 Manhattan Transfer, a 1993 science fiction novel by John E. Stith
 Manhattan transfer, a description of Doctor Manhattan's teleportation in Watchmen
 The Manhattan Transfer, jazz and pop vocal quartet
 The Manhattan Transfer (album), album by the Manhattan Transfer
 Manhattan Transfer, the ability or "Stand" of Johngalli A., a character in the manga Stone Ocean